Stori Telling, stylized as sTORI TELLING, is a 2008 book by Tori Spelling and Hilary Liftin. Published in March, by September it had risen to #1 on the New York Times Best Seller list for hardcover non-fiction books. In 2009, the book was awarded Bravo TV's A-List Award as the best celebrity autobiography of the year.

References

External links 
sTORI Telling at Simon & Schuster
Excerpts from Oxygen (TV network)

2008 non-fiction books
American autobiographies
Books about entertainers